The year 1724 in music involved some significant musical events.

Events
Johann Sebastian Bach composes the Sanctus for his later Mass in B minor.
John Frederick Lampe arrives in Britain.
Joseph Bodin de Boismortier moves to Paris from Perpignan.
Agostino Steffani is elected honorary president of the Academy of Antient Musick in London.
Johann Adolph Hasse arrives in Naples.
The Le Saraste violin is made by Antonio Stradivari (now owned by the Real Concervatorio Superior de Música in Madrid, Spain).
In Rome, Domenico Scarlatti meets Farinelli and Johann Joachim Quantz.
Marriage of the daughter of music publisher Jean-Baptiste-Christophe Ballard to the printer François Boivin.
Sébastien de Brossard's collection of manuscripts is bought by King Louis XV of France.
Renatus Harris builds his last organ, that of St Dionis Backchurch in the City of London.
7 April Johann Sebastian Bach premieres his St John Passion (BWV 245, BC D 2a) at St. Nicholas Church, Leipzig.

Published music
Attilio Ariosti
6 Cantatas (London)
6 Lessons, for viola d'amore and basso continuo (London)
 Francesco Barsanti – Sonate [6], for recorder or violin and continuo, Op. 1 (London)
Joseph Bodin de Boismortier – Cantates françoises (Les Quatre Saisons) (four cantatas for solo voice, various instruments, and basso continuo), Op. 5 (Paris)
François Couperin – Les goûts-réunis, ou Nouveaux concerts (Paris)
William Croft – Musica sacra
Jean-François Dandrieu – Pièces de clavecin, Book 1
Francesco Mancini – XII Solos for recorder and continuo (London)
Thomas Marc – Suitte de pièces de dessus et de pardessus de viole
Benedetto Marcello – Estro poetico-armonico: parafrasi sopra li primi venticinque salmi, vols. 1–4 (Venice: Appresso Domenico Lovisa)
Jean-Philippe Rameau – Pieces de Clavessin

Classical music
Johann Sebastian Bach
Wo soll ich fliehen hin, BWV 5
Christ unser Herr zum Jordan kam, BWV 7
Liebster Gott, wenn werd ich sterben?, BWV 8
Meine Seel erhebt den Herren, BWV 10
St John Passion (first performance at St. Nicolaikirche in Leipzig)
Wer da gläubet und getauft wird, BWV 37
Aus tiefer Not schrei ich zu dir, BWV 38
Sie werden euch in den Bann tun, BWV 44 (cantata) and some 50 other cantatas
Herr Christ, der einge Gottessohn, BWV 96
Was Gott tut, das ist wohlgetan, BWV 99
Nimm von uns, Herr, du treuer Gott, BWV 101
Du Hirte Israel, höre, BWV 104
Du Friedefürst, Herr Jesu Christ, BWV 116
Christum wir sollen loben schon, BWV 121
Ach Herr, mich armen Sünder, BWV 135
Wo gehest du hin, BWV 166
Schmücke dich, o liebe Seele, BWV 180
Leichtgesinnte Flattergeister, BWV 181
Erwünschtes Freudenlicht, BWV 184
George Frideric Handel – Silete venti, HWV 242
Turlough O'Carolan – John Drury (composed for the wedding of a local couple, John Drury and Elizabeth Goldsmith)
 Jan Dismas Zelenka – De profundis, ZWV 97

Opera
Attilio Ariosti
Artaserse (London, King's Theatre, 1 December)
Aquilio consolo (London, King's Theatre, 21 May)
Vespasiano (London, King's Theatre, 14 January)
Antonio Caldara – Gianguir
George Frideric Handel 
Giulio Cesare (Julius Caesar), HWV 17
Tamerlano (Tamburlaine), HWV 18
Dominico Sarro – Didone abbandonata
Leonardo Vinci
Eraclea
Farnace
Ifigenia in Tauride
La Rosmira fedele
Turno Aricino
Antonio Vivaldi 
Il Giustino RV 717
La virtù trionfante dell'amore e dell'odio, ovvero il Tigrane, RV 740 (co-composed with Benedetto Micheli and Nicola Romaldi)

Theoretical writings 
 Edward Betts – An Introduction to the Skill of Musick
 Tomás Pereira – Lulu Zhengyi Xubian
 William Turner – Sound Anatomiz’d in A Philosophical Essay on Musick

Births
February 26 – Gottfried Heinrich Bach, mentally handicapped son of Johann Sebastian Bach (d. 1763)
July 18 – Duchess Maria Antonia of Bavaria, composer, singer, harpsichordist and patron (d. 1780)
August 28 – Diamante Medaglia Faini, Italian poet and composer (died 1770)
August 29 – Giovanni Battista Casti, opera librettist (died 1803)
September 14 – Ignaz Vitzthumb, composer and conductor (died 1816)
October 1 – Giovanni Battista Cirri, cellist and composer (died 1808)
December 8 – Claude Balbastre, organist, harpsichordist and composer (died 1799)
date unknown – Joan Rossell, Catalan composer (died 1780)

Deaths
March 7 – Wolfgang Nicolaus Pertl, musician and grandfather of Wolfgang Amadeus Mozart
May 21 – Antonio Salvi, librettist for Vivaldi (born 1664)
June 7 (buried) – Johann Hugo von Wilderer, composer (born c.1670)
June 24 – Johann Theile, singer and composer (born 1646)
August 24 – Andreas Kneller, composer (born 1649)
probable 
John Abell, countertenor, composer and lutenist (born 1653)
Antonio Quintavalle, opera composer

References

 
18th century in music
Music by year